Calophyllum streimannii is a species of flowering plant in the Calophyllaceae family. It is found only in Papua New Guinea.

References

streimannii
Flora of Papua New Guinea
Data deficient plants
Endemic flora of Papua New Guinea
Taxonomy articles created by Polbot